Stylosanthes guianensis, the stylo, is a species of flowering plant in the family Fabaceae. It is native to the New World Tropics and Subtropics, and has been introduced to Puerto Rico, the Windward Islands, Trinidad and Tobago, most of SubSaharan Africa, Madagascar, Mauritius, Réunion, Rodrigues, the Indian Subcontinent, Sri Lanka, Thailand, southeast China, Hainan, Taiwan, New Guinea, Queensland, New Caledonia, and the Cook Islands. An important forage and fodder species, its palatability to livestock increases as the plant matures, making it an unusual, and valuable, deferred feed. It has high genetic diversity between and among its named varieties.

Subtaxa
The following subtaxa are accepted:
Stylosanthes guianensis subsp. dissitiflora (B.L.Rob. & Seaton) Mohlenbr. – Mexico, Honduras
Stylosanthes guianensis var. gracilis (Kunth) Vogel –  Guatemala to Argentina, and a few introductions in Africa
Stylosanthes guianensis subsp. guianensis – Entire range, also the most introduced subtaxon
Stylosanthes guianensis var. pauciflora M.B.Ferreira & Sousa Costa – Colombia, Venezuela, Brazil

References

guianensis
Fodder
Forages
Flora of Mexico
Flora of Central America
Flora of northern South America
Flora of western South America
Flora of Brazil
Flora of Northeast Argentina
Flora of Northwest Argentina
Flora of Paraguay
Flora of Uruguay
Plants described in 1789